Victor Manuel Torres Jr. (born July 22, 1947) is a Democratic member of the Florida Senate who has represented the 15th district, encompassing Osceola County and southern Orange County, since 2016. Previously, he served two terms in the Florida House of Representatives, representing parts of Orlando in Orange County from 2012 to 2016.

History
Torres was born in New York City, where he graduated from Harren High School in 1966. Following graduation, he enlisted in the United States Marine Corps, serving for four years from 1966 to 1970. During his service, Torres was stationed in Okinawa in Japan, and was awarded the Good Conduct Medal. Returning to the United States, Torres attended John Jay College, but did not graduate, and joined the New York City Transit Police, serving for twenty years before retiring as a detective. In 1993, he moved with his family to Florida, initially settling in Marion County, where he worked as a school bus driver and served on the Marion County Democratic Executive Committee. Torres moved to Orlando, and in 2010 was the field director for Amy Mercado, the Democratic nominee for the Florida House of Representatives in District 35.

Florida Legislature

House of Representatives 
When the state's legislative districts were redrawn in 2012, Torres opted to run in the newly created 48th District, which includes parts of Orlando in Orange County. Torres won the nomination of the Democratic Party unopposed, and advanced to the general election, where he was also unopposed, winning his first term entirely uncontested. He was re-elected without opposition to his second term in 2014 without opposition.

While serving in the legislature, Torres took a strong position against legislation proposed by State Representative Heather Fitzenhagen that would allow people without criminal records to carry firearms without a permit during natural disasters, arguing that firearms in hurricane shelters had the potential to be dangerous and noting, "I hope that tragedy will not be a byproduct of our decision here today." Additionally, when State Senator Dwight Bullard, a proponent of raising the state's minimum wage, challenged lawmakers to live on the minimum wage for a week, Torres accepted the offer and did so.

Senate 
Torres ran for the Florida Senate seat vacated when senator Darren Soto opted to run for Florida's 9th Congressional District. Torres defeated Republican Peter Vivaldi in the general election, 56 to 44%. Torres' daughter, Amy Mercado, succeeded him in the House, making the two the first father and daughter to serve in the Florida Legislature at the same time.

References

External links
Florida Senate – Victor Manuel Torres Jr.
Florida House of Representatives – Victor Manuel Torres Jr.

1947 births
Living people
Puerto Rican people in Florida politics
American politicians of Cuban descent
Democratic Party members of the Florida House of Representatives
21st-century American politicians
United States Marines
Hispanic and Latino American state legislators in Florida